Xiphophorus nezahualcoyotl, the mountain swordtail, is a live bearing fish in the family Poeciliidae. It is endemic to the northwestern Pánuco River basin in Mexico. The specific name of this fish refers to the poet, philosopher and emperor of Texcoco, Nezahualcoyotl (1402-1472).

References

nezahualcoyotl
Taxa named by Mary Rauchenberger
Taxa named by Klaus D. Kallman
Taxa named by Donald Charles Morizot
Fish described in 1990